The 2020 Davidson Wildcats baseball team represented Davidson College during the 2020 NCAA Division I baseball season. It was is the program's 119th baseball season, and their 5th season the Atlantic 10 Conference. The regular season began on February 15, 2020 and prematurely concluded on March 12, 2020 due to the COVID-19 pandemic.

Preseason

A10 media poll
The Atlantic 10 baseball media poll was released on February 10, 2020. Davidson was picked to finish 5th in the Atlantic 10.

Roster

Game log 

Schedule Source:
*Rankings are based on the team's current ranking in the D1Baseball poll.

Rankings

Honors

Preseason honors

References

External links 
 Davidson College Baseball

Davidson
Davidson Wildcats baseball seasons
Davidson Wildcats baseball